Han Soon-Chul (born December 30, 1984) is an amateur boxer from South Korea who won a silver medal at the 2012 Summer Olympics, and competed at the 2006 Asian Games in the Bantamweight (-54 kg) division winning the silver medal.  At the 2010 Asian Games he won a bronze medal in the lightweight (-60 kg) division.

Career 
At the 2006 Asian Games he beat Enkhbatyn Badar-Uugan but lost against the Philippines's Joan Tipon.

At the World Championships in 2007 he lost early to Ukrainian Maxim Tretyak.

At the second Olympic qualifier for the 2008 Summer Olympics, he lost to Hurshid Tajibayev but beat Dinesh Kumara Mahju for the all-important third place to qualify for the Beijing Olympics. He lost his first Olympic match to Héctor Manzanilla 6:17.

Having moved up to the lightweight category, Han qualified for the 2012 Summer Olympics.  He beat Mohamed Ramadan, Vazgen Safaryants, Fazliddin Gaibnazarov and Evaldas Petrauskas before losing to Vasyl Lomachenko in the final.

References 

1984 births
Living people
Bantamweight boxers
Boxers at the 2008 Summer Olympics
Boxers at the 2012 Summer Olympics
Olympic boxers of South Korea
Olympic silver medalists for South Korea
Olympic medalists in boxing
Asian Games medalists in boxing
Boxers at the 2006 Asian Games
Boxers at the 2010 Asian Games
Boxers at the 2014 Asian Games
Medalists at the 2012 Summer Olympics
South Korean male boxers
Sportspeople from Seoul
Asian Games silver medalists for South Korea
Asian Games bronze medalists for South Korea

Medalists at the 2006 Asian Games
Medalists at the 2010 Asian Games